Pontida is a comune (municipality) in the Province of Bergamo in the Italian region of Lombardy, located about  northeast of Milan and about  northwest of Bergamo.

It has been the location of the Pontida's Oath on 7 April 1167.

Pontida received the honorary title of city with a presidential decree on July 11, 2006.

Geography
The municipality of Pontida contains the frazioni (subdivisions, mainly villages and hamlets) Boffuro, Buttarello, Cà Barile, Cà Frosco, Cà Pietaglio, Canto, Cerchiera, Costa, Gaggio Sopra, Gaggio Sotto, Ghiringhello, Grombosco, Gromfaleggio, Massera, Metà Ripa di Sotto, Odiago, Roncallo, Sotto i Ronchi, Torchio, Valmora

Pontida borders the following municipalities: Ambivere, Brivio, Calco, Caprino Bergamasco, Carvico, Cisano Bergamasco, Palazzago, Sotto il Monte Giovanni XXIII, Villa d'Adda.

Demographic evolution

History

Pontida's main claim to historical renown is due to the Oath of Pontida, signed there in 1167 and marking the foundation of the Lombard League, which nine years later would go on to defeat Emperor Frederick I Barbarossa at the Battle of Legnano.

The "Oath of Pontida" often inspired Italian nationalists during the 19th century Risorgimento, struggling against the Austrian occupation, and seeing this historical event as a precedent and inspiration for their own struggle.

References